David McMillan (born 1956) is a British-Australian former drug smuggler who is best known for being the only Westerner on record as having successfully escaped Bangkok's Klong Prem prison. His exploits were detailed in several books and in the 2011 Australian telemovie Underbelly Files: The Man Who Got Away.

Early life
McMillan was born in Saint Marylebone, London, England, on 9 April 1956. He is the son of John McMillan CBE, who was the controller of Associated-Rediffusion Television, and his Australian wife. After his parents separated, he emigrated to Australia with his mother and sister. He attended Caulfield Grammar School in Melbourne, Victoria. After working as a cinema projectionist and camera operator in Sydney, he began a short-lived career in advertising with Masius Wynne Williams in Melbourne.

Criminal career
A part-time job at a city cinema introduced McMillan to the fringes of the underworld; a group of safe-crackers who had turned to narcotics when police surveillance curtailed their traditional profession. Connections with the free-marijuana hippie lobbyists brought those two worlds together and a tempting opportunity for McMillan, who was well-travelled. At the time, he was a distributor of the monthly magazine, The Australasian Weed, a drug-reform periodical, and advocated the complete lifting of the prohibition against drugs for recreational use. McMillan then began a career as a drug smuggler, during which he developed the bag-duplication system at Sydney's Kingsford-Smith Airport in the late 1970s as he smuggled hashish from India. In 1979, McMillan fell out with disgraced peer Lord Tony Moynihan after the exiled lord attempted to trap McMillan in a gambling-sting operation using the large-scale bets of the Chinese-run cockfights in Manila. Moynihan had hoped to employ McMillan's technical expertise to detonate an explosive capsule in the necks of fighting cocks, and so determine the winners.

Moynihan planned only to swindle McMillan out of the betting stake after a test game. McMillan was alerted to the scam by his Chinese film-making friends and left the Philippines after cautioning Moynihan. Moynihan would later move on to hoodwink smuggler Howard Marks in the 1980s, resulting in Marks's conviction and imprisonment in America. Imprudent spending attracted the attention of federal police when a Clénet Coachworks car was imported from California bearing papers that had greatly undervalued the vehicle. This slip-up led to a major investigation which eventually revealed houses, businesses and properties along the eastern coast of Australia bought with cash and valued in millions of dollars. These assets later became the subject of Australia's first important confiscation of drug-earned assets. At the peak of his career in the 1980s, McMillan was a multi-millionaire and maintained homes, offices and apartments all over the world.

After three years, McMillan and business partner Michael Sullivan were arrested following Operation Aries, a Victoria Police/Federal Police taskforce operation reported to have cost over A$2 million. McMillan and Sullivan, along with their partners, Clelia Teresa Vigano and Mary Escolar Castillo respectively, had been arrested on 5 January 1982 for conspiracy to import heroin. The four had several false passports between them and stood trial with S. Chowdury and Brendan Healy on twelve counts of conspiring to import drugs between 1979 and 1981.  Healy was acquitted on all charges, and nine others accused of the conspiracy accepted indemnity against prosecution in exchange for testifying against their co-conspirators. McMillan stood accused of travelling under 30 false passports and keeping station houses in London, Brussels and Bangkok. The trial heard charges of an attempt to escape Melbourne's high-security Pentridge Prison by helicopter using former SAS personnel in a scheme engineered by a vengeful Lord Moynihan.

The prosecution opposed bail for Castillo, who had a four-month-old baby with Sullivan, because she had access to funds and it was thought she could flee to her wealthy parents in her native Colombia. The police surgeon reported that all four defendants were habitual heroin users. Clelia Vigano and Mary Castillo were two of three women who died in a fire at HM Prison Fairlea on the evening of Saturday 6 February 1982. After her death, Castillo's baby went into the custody of Sullivan's mother. The consequent six-month trial produced 116 witnesses and a hung jury that finally returned a verdict after seven days sequestration. Despite being acquitted of 11 of the 12 counts, McMillan was found guilty of the remaining count and was sentenced to 17 years, before being released in 1993 on parole. During the trial, agents from the United States’ Drug Enforcement Administration testified against the Thai national Chowdury who they believed had links to the Golden Triangle's third biggest heroin exporter, and to the kidnap and murder of an agent's wife in Chiang Mai.  McMillan denied any connection with Chowdury, and was acquitted of the relevant charge, however the American involvement led to a lifelong antipathy between the DEA and McMillan.

Thailand
While on parole, McMillan flew to Thailand, travelling under the name Daniel Westlake. After a close call at Don Muang airport, he was arrested in Bangkok's Chinatown and charged with heroin trafficking. He was held in Klong Prem Central Prison. Klong Prem Central prison (Thai: คลองเปรม; rtgs: Khlong Prem) is a maximum security prison in Chatuchak District, Bangkok, Thailand. The prison has several separate sections and houses up to 20,000 inmates. Due to his financial status, McMillan lived more comfortably than the average inmate while in prison. McMillan had his own chef and servants, dined on food bought from the supermarket, and also had his own office, television and radio.

Facing the death penalty and a transfer to Asia's most notorious prison Bang Kwang Central Prison, also known colloquially as the Bangkok Hilton, McMillan resolved to escape.  In August 1996 he cut the cell bars with hacksaws, scaled seven inner walls, then mounted the outer wall using a bamboo-pole ladder during the night. Once out of the prison, McMillan changed into civilian clothes and carried an umbrella as he walked away from the prison. McMillan credits the umbrella with helping him escape, saying that "escaping prisoners don't carry umbrellas".

Within four hours of escaping the prison McMillan had boarded a plane to Singapore using a false passport, narrowly evading pursuing prison authorities. He later stated that there was "nothing better than the suction sound of an aeroplane door being sealed." Future Australian attorney-general Robert McClelland when praising Australia's embassy in Thailand remarked that McMillan: "… a prisoner... escaped from the Thai jail in quite exceptional and athletic circumstances. In terms of mere escape, it was really quite an achievement." He wasn't apprehended in Singapore, which also has the death penalty.

Pakistan
McMillan travelled to Balouchistan, Pakistan, where he lived under the protection of Mir Noor Jehan Magsi of the Magsi clan. He then began exporting drugs to Scandinavia.

McMillan was later arrested in Lahore, Pakistan, as a result of the confession of a captured courier. McMillan was flown to Karachi, Pakistan, and held in Karachi Central Jail. This jail maintained a class system for prisoners, through which McMillan kept servants and private rooms. Due to a financial dispute with the prison superintendent concerning his illegal mobile phone, McMillan was transferred at night to the Hyderabad jail, where he was kept in the dungeons until being rescued by Lord Magsi. Not wishing to add to the existing Interpol warrants, McMillan returned to Karachi to stand trial, where he was acquitted by a Customs Court judge who found there was no evidence that McMillan had sponsored the courier, and that the government of Thailand had not made representations for extradition.

Return to England
McMillan returned to London in 1999. He was arrested at Heathrow airport in 2002 for smuggling 500 grams of class A drugs, and served two years in prison. His Thai warrant for heroin trafficking remained outstanding, as did a warrant in Australia for breach of parole.

McMillan was arrested again in April 2012, in an operation referred to Bromley police by the UK Border Agency concerning an ounce of heroin mailed from Pakistan. In the consequent trial, an undercover policewoman testified to delivering a package from which thirty grams of Asian heroin had been removed.  McMillan had not opened the parcel, addressed to a previous resident, and denied any knowledge of the unidentified sender. After a six-day trial McMillan was sentenced at Croydon Crown Court to six years' imprisonment for the evasion of the prohibition on importing A-class drugs. McMillan was released in 2014.

In November, 2014, Thailand formally began extradition proceedings against McMillan in London. He was arrested at the request of the Thai government, and held at Wandsworth prison. A long-running challenge began at the Westminster Magistrates Court headed by defence barrister Tim Owen, QC. Evidence was presented detailing human-rights abuses under the rule of the Thai generals who had staged a coup in May of that year, as well as expert evidence on Thai prison conditions. However, Judge Arbuthnot ruled against McMillan, as did the UK Home Secretary. Two weeks before McMillan was due to be sent back to Bangkok, the Thai authorities withdrew their request, stating technical reasons. McMillan was released in September 2016.

Media
As a 12-year-old, McMillan appeared nightly on the Nine Network's 'Peters Junior News', presenting news stories for children in a regular 5-minute TV bulletin.

McMillan detailed his escape from Klong Prem in his 2008 autobiography Escape. In June 2009, he appeared as a guest in a 50-minute episode of Danny Dyer's Deadliest Men 2: Living Dangerously, which aired on Bravo TV. The episode presented McMillan as having settled peacefully with his partner Jeanette and children.

In 2011, Australia's Nine Network produced and aired Underbelly Files: The Man Who Got Away. The third in the Underbelly Files series, the film was based on McMillan's smuggling, arrest, imprisonment in Bangkok and briefly outlined his escape from Klong Prem. An accompanying book, McVillain: the Man Who Got Away was published by Pan Macmillan in April 2011.

In late April 2017, McMillan published Unforgiving Destiny - The Relentless Pursuit of a Black Marketeer, a second autobiography detailing his experiences in Afghanistan and Thailand and his 2016 trial.
David McMillan narrated his autobiographical work, Unforgiving Destiny, which has been listed as an audiobook with Audible in July, 2021.

See also
 List of Caulfield Grammar School people

References

External links
Official website, with background to Unforgiving Destiny, photo gallery and interviews
ESCAPE Paperback: 320 pages, Publisher: Mainstream Publishing (3 July 2008) Language English 
ESCAPE: THE PAST Paperback: 264 pages, Publisher: Monsoon Books (Oct 2011) Language English;  paperback Amazon listing;  ebook 
Escape from Klong Prem Richard Barrow, ThaiPrisonLife.com
Unforgiving destiny: Amazon UK author and title pages Published 2017; 422 pages, 6"x9" Trade format

1956 births
Australian drug traffickers
Australian escapees
Australian expatriates in Pakistan
Australian memoirists
Australian non-fiction crime writers
Australian people imprisoned abroad
British drug traffickers
British escapees
British people imprisoned abroad
Escapees from Thai detention
Fugitives
David McMillan
Klong Prem Central Prison inmates
Living people
People educated at Caulfield Grammar School
Prisoners and detainees of England and Wales
Prisoners and detainees of Pakistan